Emmanuel Church or Immanuel Church may refer to:

Christian denominations
Emmanuel Association, a Methodist Christian denomination in the conservative holiness movement

Local churches

Canada
 Emmanuel United Church

Denmark
 Immanuel Church, Copenhagen

England
 Emmanuel United Reformed Church, Cambridge - now Downing Place United Reformed Church, Cambridge
 Immanuel Church, Feniscowles, Lancashire
 Emmanuel Church, Nottingham, Nottinghamshire
 Immanuel Church, Oswaldtwistle, Lancashire
 Emmanuel Church, Preston, Lancashire
 Emmanuel Church, West Hampstead, London.
 Emmanuel Church, Woodley, Berkshire

India
 Emmanuel Church, Mumbai

Indonesia
 Immanuel Church, Jakarta

Israel
Immanuel Church (Tel Aviv-Yafo)

Sweden
Immanuel Church, Jönköping
Immanuel Church, Norrköping
Immanuel Church, Stockholm

Switzerland
Emmanuel Episcopal Church (Geneva)

Syria
Emmanuel Church, Aleppo, seat of the Union of the Armenian Evangelical Churches in the Near East

United States
 Emmanuel Church of the Evangelical Association of Binghamton, New York
 Emmanuel Church at Brook Hill, Henrico, Virginia, listed on the NRHP in Virginia
 Emmanuel Church (Greenwood, Virginia), listed on the NRHP in Virginia
 Emmanuel Church (Killingworth, Connecticut), listed on the U.S. National Register of Historic Places (NRHP)
 Immanuel Church (La Grange, Tennessee)
 Emmanuel Church (Newport, Rhode Island), listed on the NRHP in Rhode Island
 Emmanuel Church (Port Conway, Virginia), listed on the NRHP in Virginia
 Living Word International Christian Church (formerly Immanuel's Church) (Silver Spring, Maryland)

See also
 Emmanuel Baptist Church (disambiguation)
 Emmanuel Episcopal Church (disambiguation)
 Emmanuel Lutheran Church (disambiguation)